The Ala Moana Hotel is a hotel in Honolulu, Hawaii, opened in 1970. It adjoins the Ala Moana Shopping Center and is across the street from the Hawaii Convention Center as well as the Ala Moana Beach Park.

History
The Ala Moana Hotel was designed by the Seattle architectural firm of John Graham & Company. It opened in 1970 as part of Flagship Hotels, the hotel division of American Airlines. The hotel was renamed the Ala Moana Americana in 1972, when American bought Americana Hotels. The Ala Moana Americana was sold by co-owners Dillingham Corp. and Pick-Americana Hotels of Dallas to the Japan-based Azabu USA in 1986 for $70 million. Azabu undertook $31 million in renovations and brought in Ramada Renaissance Hotels to manager the property, which was renamed Ramada Renaissance Ala Moana Hotel. Azabu sold the Ala Moana for $85 million in 2004 to Crescent Heights, a Miami-based condominium developer. Crescent Heights sold approximately 800 of the hotel's 1154 rooms as condominium units, for approximately $200,000 each. Outrigger Hotels took over management of the hotel portion in 2006, though the hotel did not take on their name. Outrigger sold their interest in the hotel to the Australia-based Mantra Group for $52.5 million in 2016.

The Ala Moana Hotel has 1,169 rooms.

It is not to be confused with the Moana Surfrider Hotel, which was built about 70 years earlier.

Architecture 
Ala Moana Hotel was recognized by the Building Industry Association of Hawaii as a 2006 Parade of Homes standout.

See also
List of tallest buildings in Honolulu

References

External links
 

Hawaiian architecture
Skyscrapers in Honolulu
Hotels in Honolulu
Skyscraper hotels in Hawaii
Hotel buildings completed in 1970
Hotels established in 1970
1970 establishments in Hawaii